Crataegus vulsa, the Alabama hawthorn, is a rare species of hawthorn from northeastern Alabama and northwestern Georgia.

References

vulsa
Flora of Alabama
Flora of Georgia (U.S. state)